The New Tecumseth Civics are a Canadian Junior ice hockey team based in Alliston, Ontario.  They play in the Greater Metro Junior A Hockey League (GMHL).

History
The Alliston Coyotes joined the GMHL in spring 2013. The Coyotes played their first game, at home, on September 12, 2013. Hosting the Toronto Attack, the Coyotes lost 4-2.  The first goal in team history was scored by Gordy Bonnel 18 seconds into the second period of play.  Bruno Novotny played the first game in net, making 44 saves in the effort. On September 19, 2013, the Coyotes would pick up their first franchise win in an 8-1 victory over the Knights of Meaford.  Filip Sedivy would pick up the eventual game-winning goal at 5:40 of the first period.  In goal, Nicolas Lachance made 29 saves for the victory.

In April 2016, Alliston Coyotes have been re-branded the New Tecumseth Civics after Ryan Wood, who had won two Russell Cup Champions in the previous three years, was brought in to manage the franchise.

Season-by-season standings

References

External links
Civics Webpage
GMHL Webpage

2013 establishments in Ontario
Ice hockey clubs established in 2013
Ice hockey teams in Ontario